Rina Jordana Adnan (born 24 November 1980) is a Malaysian Pencak silat  martial artist.

She competed at the  2008 Asian Beach Games, winning a silver medal in Tanding class A.

From  2006 to 2016, she was a member of the  Selangor team in the National Futsal League (LFK)

References

External links 

 Rina Jordana Haji Adnan of Malaysia attempts to cool down... News Photo - Getty Images

1980 births
Malaysian martial artists
Living people